Honduras is a member of the United Nations, the World Trade Organization (WTO), the Central American Parliament (PARLACEN), the Central American Integration System (SICA), and the Central American Security Commission (CASQ). During 1995-96, Honduras, a founding member of the United Nations, for the first time served as a non-permanent member of the United Nations Security Council. Honduras is also a member of the International Criminal Court with a Bilateral Immunity Agreement of protection for the US-military (as covered under Article 98).

Central American relations
President Flores consulted frequently with the other Central American presidents on issues of mutual interest. He continued his predecessor's strong emphasis on Central American cooperation and integration, which resulted in an agreement easing border controls and tariffs among Honduras, Guatemala, Nicaragua, and El Salvador. Honduras also joined its six Central American neighbors at the 1994 Summit of the Americas in signing the Alliance for Sustainable Development, known as the Conjunta Centroamerica-USA, or CONCAUSA, to promote sustainable economic development in the region. Honduras held the 6-month SICA presidency during the second half of 1998.

At the 17th Central American Summit in 1995, hosted by Honduras in the northern city of San Pedro Sula, the region's six countries (excluding Belize) signed treaties creating confidence- and security-building measures and combating the smuggling of stolen automobiles in the isthmus. In subsequent summits (held every 6 months), Honduras has continued to work with the other Central American countries on issues of common concern.

Relations by country

Illicit drugs
Honduras is a transshipment point for drugs and narcotics; illicit producer of cannabis, cultivated on small plots and used principally for local consumption; corruption is a major problem.

Parts of this article are based on text from the CIA World Factbook.

See also
 List of diplomatic missions in Honduras
 List of diplomatic missions of Honduras

References